Serock may refer to the following places:
Serock, Kuyavian-Pomeranian Voivodeship (north-central Poland)
Serock, Lublin Voivodeship (east Poland)
Serock in Masovian Voivodeship (east-central Poland)